Events from the year 1757 in Sweden

Incumbents
 Monarch – Adolf Frederick

Events

 May - Sweden form an alliance with France and Austria against Prussia. 
 13 September - Sweden joins the Seven Years' War through the Pomeranian War. 
 - A regulation is formed for the ongoing agricultural land reform Storskiftet.
 - People with epilepsy are banned from marrying. 
 - Blockade of Stralsund
 - Gustav Badin is presented as a gift to the Queen.

Births

 16 March - Bengt Lidner, poet  (died 1793)
 29 March - Carl Axel Arrhenius, chemist (died 1824) 
 30 March - Sophie Piper, courtier (died 1816) 
 31 March -  Gustaf Mauritz Armfelt, royal favorite (died 1814) 
 14 July - Anders Fredrik Skjöldebrand, minister and general (died 1834) 
 27 September – Henric Schartau, pietist (died 1825) 
 10 October - Erik Acharius, botanist (died 1819)
 Christina Fris, industrialist (died 1835)

Deaths

 Erland Broman, royal favorite (born 1704)
 Rika Maja, Sami shaman (born 1661)

References

 
Years of the 18th century in Sweden
Sweden